Cerebral Cortex is a scientific journal in the neuroscience area, focusing on the development, organization, plasticity, and function of the cerebral cortex, including the hippocampus. It is published by Oxford University Press, and had as its founding editor Patricia Goldman-Rakic.

References

External links

 Official website

Neuroscience journals
Oxford University Press academic journals
Cognitive science journals
Publications established in 1991
Monthly journals